The Man from Earth is a 2007 American science fiction drama film directed by Richard Schenkman. It was written by Jerome Bixby, who conceived the screenplay in the early 1960s and completed it on his deathbed in April 1998. It stars David Lee Smith as John Oldman, a departing university professor, who claims to be a caveman who has secretly survived for more than 14,000 years. The entire film is set in and around Oldman's house during his farewell party and is composed almost entirely of dialogue. The plot advances through intellectual arguments between Oldman and his fellow faculty members.

The screenplay mirrors similar concepts of longevity which Bixby had introduced in "Requiem for Methuselah", a Star Trek episode he wrote which originally aired in 1969. The Man from Earth gained recognition in part for being widely distributed through Internet peer-to-peer networks, which raised its profile. The film was later adapted by Schenkman into a stage play.

Plot
Professor John Oldman is packing his belongings onto his truck, preparing to move to a new home. His colleagues show up to give him an impromptu farewell party: Harry, a biologist; Edith, an art history professor and devout Christian; Dan, an anthropologist; Sandy, a historian who is in (unrequited) love with John; Art, an archaeologist; and his younger student Linda.

As John's colleagues press him to explain the reason for his departure, he picks up from a reference to Magdalenian cultures by Dan and slowly, and somewhat reluctantly, reveals that he was born in the Paleolithic period. He states that he has lived for more than 14 millennia, and that he relocates every ten years to keep others from realizing that he does not age. He begins his tale under the guise of a possible science-fiction story, but eventually stops speaking in hypotheticals and begins answering questions from a first-person perspective. His colleagues refuse to believe his story but accept it as a working hypothesis in order to glean his true intentions. John relates he was a Sumerian for 2000 years, later a Babylonian, and eventually went east to become a disciple of the Buddha. He claims to have had a chance to sail with Columbus (admitting that at the time he still believed the earth was flat) and to have befriended Van Gogh (one of whose original paintings he apparently owns, a gift from the artist himself).

In the course of the conversation, each guest questions John's story based on knowledge from their own academic specialty. Harry struggles with how biology could allow for the possibility of a human being living for so long. Art, arguably the most skeptical of the group, questions prehistory. He exclaims that John's answers, although correct, could have come from any textbook; John rejoins that, like any human, his memory is imperfect and he only sees events from his own narrow, hence not omniscient, perspective. Dr. Will Gruber, a psychiatry professor who arrives at Art's request later that afternoon, questions if John feels guilt for outliving everyone he has ever known and loved. He then threatens John with a gun (later revealed to have been unloaded) before temporarily leaving.  John then learns from Harry that Will's wife had died the previous day after a long illness.  John chases after Will, expresses his condolences and John rejoins the group.

The discussion veers to religion, and John mentions that he does not follow any. Even though he does not necessarily believe in an omnipotent God, he does not discount the possibility of such a being's existence. Pressed by the group, John reluctantly reveals that in trying to take the Buddha's teachings to the west, into the eastern Roman Empire, he became the inspiration for the Jesus story. After this revelation, emotions in the room run high. Edith (the representative "true believer" of the group) begins crying. Will, who has returned after saying he drove around and didn’t know where else to go, demands that John end his tale and give the group a sense of closure by admitting it was all a hoax. He threatens to have John involuntarily committed for psychiatric evaluation should he refuse to do so. John appears to ruminate over his response before finally "confessing" to everyone that his story was a prank.

John's friends leave the party with various reactions: Edith is relieved; Harry indicates an open mind; Art never wants to see John again; Will still believes John needs professional help; Sandy and Linda clearly believe John; Dan is heavily implied to believe John. After everyone else but Will and Sandy have left, Will overhears John and Sandy's conversation, which suggests the story could be true after all. John mentions some of the pseudonyms he has used over the years, and Will realizes one was his father's name. He asks John questions that only a very close acquaintance could answer. When John answers them correctly, Will has an emotional breakdown, suffers a heart attack, and dies in John’s arms. After the body has been taken away, Sandy realizes that (if the story is true) this is the first time John has seen one of his grown children die. John wordlessly gets in his truck and starts to drive to an unknown destination. Having reconsidered, he then stops and waits for Sandy, who slowly walks over and gets in. They both depart in John's truck.

Cast
In order of appearance:

 David Lee Smith as John Oldman
 Tony Todd as Dan
 John Billingsley as Harry
 Ellen Crawford as Edith
 Annika Peterson as Sandy
 William Katt as Art Jenkins
 Alexis Thorpe as Linda Murphy
 Richard Riehle as Dr. Will Gruber
 Robbie Bryan as Police Officer

Production
The story is Jerome Bixby's last work, which he completed on his deathbed in April 1998. Bixby dictated the last of the screenplay to his son, screenwriter Emerson Bixby. After Jerome Bixby's death, the script was given to Richard Schenkman to direct on a budget of just US$200,000. The film was shot in eight days after a week of rehearsals.

Release and marketing
The film screened at the San Diego Comic-Con Film Festival in July 2007, and premiered theatrically in Hemet, California, and Pitman, New Jersey, in October 2007. It was released on DVD in North America by Anchor Bay Entertainment on November 13, 2007, and became available for digital rental and sale at iTunes on September 22, 2009. It won the grand prize for Best Screenplay and first place for Best Feature at the Rhode Island Film Festival in August 2007.

Publicity through filesharing
In 2007, producer Eric D. Wilkinson publicly thanked users of BitTorrent who distributed the film without express permission, saying that it lifted the profile of the film far beyond the financier's expectations; he encouraged fans to purchase the DVD or donate.

Reception
IGN gave it an 8 out of 10, calling it "intellectual sci-fi".

DVD Verdict criticized the heavy-handed ending, saying that one's opinion of the film would be shaped by views on religion.

Awards
The film has been nominated for and won numerous awards.

 2007 – Winner – 1st place – Best Screenplay - Rhode Island International Film Festival
 2007 – Winner – Grand Prize - Best Screenplay - Rhode Island International Film Festival
 2008 – Winner – Best Film – Montevideo Fantastic Film Festival of Uruguay
 2008 – Winner – Audience Choice Award Montevideo Fantastic Film Festival of Uruguay
 2008 – Winner – Best Director - Fantaspoa – International Fantastic Film Festival of Porto Alegre, Brazil
 2008 – Winner – 2nd place – Best Screenplay - Rio de Janeiro International Fantastic Film Festival (RioFan)
 2008 – Winner – Audience Award: Best Screenplay Film – Fixion-Sars Horror & Fantastic Film Festival of Santiago, Chile
 2008 – Winner – Jury Award: Best Screenplay – Fixion-Sars Horror & Fantastic Film Festival of Santiago, Chile
 2008 – Winner – Best SCI-FI Screenplay - International Horror & Sci-Fi Film Festival, Phoenix, AZ
 2008 – Winner – Best Screenplay - Buenos Aires Rojo Sangre – Int'l Independent Horror, Fantasy & Bizarre, Argentina
 2007 – Saturn Award nominee - Best DVD Release - The Man From Earth
 2008 – Winner – DVD Critics Award – Best Non-Theatrical Movie

Soundtrack
All original music for the film was performed by Mark Hinton Stewart.

 "7th Symphony - 2nd Movement" - written by Ludwig van Beethoven
 "Forever"
Lyrics by Richard Schenkman
Music by Mark Hinton Stewart
Performed by Mark Hinton Stewart and Chantelle Duncan
Copyright - BDi Music Ltd

Play
In 2012, Richard Schenkman adapted the film to a play, which received positive reviews.

In 2013, the theater play was staged in Greece.

Sequels

A direct sequel, The Man from Earth: Holocene, was released in 2017, with David Lee Smith and William Katt respectively reprising their roles as John Oldman and Art Jenkins. Filming took place on June 2–16, 2016. The producers have stated on Facebook that it could be the first in a series.

This followed two previous attempts at producing sequels. A Kickstarter campaign to crowdfund a sequel named The Man From Earth II: Man From Earth Millennium was announced in September 2013, but it was not able to collect the minimum-required support by October 2013.

Another attempt was made to crowdfund a series, Man From Earth: The Series, based on the film. The second crowd-funding effort completed successfully in August 2014.

See also
 Immortality in fiction
 List of fictional immortals

References

External links

 
 
 
 

2007 films
2007 independent films
2007 science fiction films
2000s science fiction drama films
Films with atheism-related themes
American independent films
American science fiction drama films
2000s English-language films
Films about immortality
Films about cavemen
Films directed by Richard Schenkman
Films about conversations
Religion in science fiction
2000s American films